A list of Western films released in the 2000s.

TV shows of the 2000s
see List of TV Westerns

References

2000
Western